These Words is the debut album of Japanese singer Angela Aki, released on January 4, 2000. The album is completely in English and is her only album to date released in the United States. Tony Alany is credited with working on and producing the album. Alany and Aki recorded the album in a recording studio located in a back room of a coffee house in Vienna, Virginia called Jam'n Java. Following production of the album, Tony Alany and Aki were married.

Track listing

* Length is combined length of Magic and Come Home to Me as both are contained on the same track (Track 10).

References

2000 debut albums
Angela Aki albums